Brettach may refer to:

 Brettach (Jagst), a river in Baden-Württemberg, Germany, tributary of the Jagst
 Brettach (Kocher), a river in Baden-Württemberg, Germany, tributary of the Kocher